The 1977–78 UC Irvine Anteaters men's basketball team represented the University of California, Irvine during the 1977–78 NCAA Division I men's basketball season. This was the program's first season in Division I after spending the previous 12 season in Division II. The Anteaters were led by ninth year head coach Tim Taft and played their home games at Crawford Hall as members of the Pacific Coast Athletic Association. They finished their inaugural season 8–17 and were 2–12 in PCAA play to finish 8th place. The anteaters did not receive an invitation to the 1978 PCAA tournament.

Previous season 
The 1976–77 UC Irvine Anteaters men's basketball team finished their final season in NCAA Division II as an Independent with a record of 10–17.

In July 1977, the anteaters were formally accepted into the Pacific Coast Athletic Association and reclassified as an NCAA Division I program beginning with the 1977–78 season.

Off-season

Incoming transfer

1977 Recruiting Class

Source

Roster

Schedule and results

|-
!colspan=12 style="background:#002244; color:#FFDE6C;"| Regular season

Source

Awards and honors
Wayne Smith 
Second Team All-PCAA

Team players drafted into the NBA

Source

References

UC Irvine
UC Irvine Anteaters men's basketball seasons
UC Irvine Anteaters
UC Irvine Anteaters